Eric Sturgess and Sheila Summers defeated the defending champions John Bromwich and Louise Brough in the final, 9–7, 9–11, 7–5 to win the mixed doubles tennis title at the 1949 Wimbledon Championships.

Seeds

  John Bromwich /  Louise Brough (final)
  Bill Sidwell /  Margaret Osborne (semifinals)
  Bob Falkenburg /  Gussie Moran (withdrew)
  Eric Sturgess /  Sheila Summers (champions)

Draw

Finals

Top half

Section 1

Section 2

Section 3

Section 4

Bottom half

Section 5

Section 6

Section 7

Section 8

References

External links

X=Mixed Doubles
Wimbledon Championship by year – Mixed doubles